Barje may refer to:

 Barje Čiflik, a village in Serbia
 Barje, Bosilegrad, a village in Serbia
 Barje (Dimitrovgrad), a village in Serbia
 Barje (Leskovac), a village in Serbia